The 2012 Vale of Glamorgan Council election took place on Thursday 3 May 2012 to elect members of Vale of Glamorgan Council in Wales. This was the same day as other United Kingdom local elections. The previous full council election took place on 1 May 2008 and the next one took place on 4 May 2017.

Election result
The Conservatives lost control of the council after losing 14 seats. The Labour Party became the largest grouping, but failed to win enough seats for an overall majority. This meant they could either run a minority administration or form a coalition with one of the smaller political groups. Conservative leader of the council, Gordon Kemp, lost his Rhoose seat to an Independent candidate after a recount. He blamed his party's poor performance on the UK Conservative coalition government.

|}

Ward results

By-elections 2012-2017
Buttrills (2012)
Caused by the death of Labour councillor Margaret Alexander, the by-election took place on 2 August 2012 with the vacant seat taken from Labour by Plaid Cymru's Ian Johnson.

Llantwit Major (2015)
Caused by the death in January of Llantwit First councillor Keith Geary, the by-election took place on 26 March 2015, with the vacant seat won by 12 votes by Tony Bennett for the Conservatives.

Rhoose (2016)
Caused by the death of Independent councillor Paul Clarke in a motorcycle accident. The by-election, on 30 June 2016, was won by Independent candidate Adam Riley (with the Conservative's ex-council leader Gordon Kemp in second place).

Gibbonsdown (2016)
The by-election in this Barry ward was caused by the resignation of Labour councillor Rob Curtis and took place on 3 November 2016. It was won by Labour candidate Julie Aviet, with 47.9% of the vote.

References

Vales of Glamorgan
2012